Jacopo Scannapecora (died 1506) was a Roman Catholic prelate who served as Bishop of Massa Lubrense (1466–1506).

Biography
On 15 January 1466, Jacopo Scannapecora was appointed by Pope Paul II as Bishop of Massa Lubrense.
He served as Bishop of Massa Lubrense until his death in 1506.

While bishop, he served as the principal co-consecrator of Scipione Cicinelli, Archbishop of Sorrento.

References

External links and additional sources
 (for Chronology of Bishops) 
 (for Chronology of Bishops) 

1506 deaths
16th-century Italian Roman Catholic bishops
Bishops appointed by Pope Paul II